"Nature" is an essay by Georg Christoph Tobler which is often incorrectly attributed to Johann Wolfgang von Goethe. It was first published in 1783 in the Tiefurt Journal. Tobler wrote the essay after repeated conversations with Goethe.

The essay begins: 
Nature! We are surrounded and embraced by her—unable to step out of her and unable to penetrate her more deeply.

In the first issue of Nature magazine, published on Nov 4, 1869, T. H. Huxley submitted an English translation of the essay, titled "Nature: Aphorisms by Goethe".

Sigmund Freud wrote that a public recitation of the essay, which Freud refers to as "the incomparably beautiful essay by Goethe", led him to study medicine.

Notes

External links
 Paul Carus, Goethe's Nature Philosophy

18th-century essays